Free!! was a Spanish mákina group composed of Alberto Tapia and Pedro Miras. They are known for being one of the most representative groups of the 90's Spanish "Mákina" phenomenon, at the time when this genre crossed over from dance clubs to the pop music arena. Popular songs by the group include "Doctor Beat", "This Groove", and "Kanashimi o Moyashite".

Discography

Singles

References

Spanish DJs
Musical groups established in 1994
Spanish dance music groups
Spanish electronic music groups
Spanish Eurodance groups
1994 establishments in Spain
Electronic dance music DJs